Melicope revoluta is a species of plant in the family Rutaceae. It is endemic to French Polynesia.

References

revoluta
Flora of French Polynesia
Least concern plants
Least concern flora of Oceania
Taxonomy articles created by Polbot